WW is the fifth full-length album by the Norwegian black metal band Gehenna. It was recorded and released 5 years after their previous album.

Track listing
"Grenade Prayer" - 3:49
"Death to Them All" - 3:46
"New Blood" - 3:26
"Flames of the Pit" - 4:17
"Silence the Earth" - 4:24
"Werewolf" - 6:19
"Abattoir" - 3:57
"Pallbearer" - 6:45

Credits
Sanrabb - Guitar, Vocals & Synth
Dolgar - Guitar & Vocals
Amok - Bass
Kine - Keyboards

Additional Credits
Frost - Session Drums & Percussion

External links
Chronicles of Chaos review of WW
Metal Storm review of WW

2005 albums
Gehenna (band) albums